There are two species of snake named banded cat-eyed snake:
 Leptodeira annulata
 Leptodeira ashmeadii